RAC7 is a Canadian video game company located in Vancouver. The company is most known for their game Sneaky Sasquatch. As of 2022, the company only has two employees: Jesse Ringrose and Jason Ennis.

Games

Awards
Dark Echo:
 Most Innovative iPhone Game, 2015

Splitter Critters:
 iPhone Game of the Year, 2017
 Apple Design Award, 2017
 Excellence in Innovation, International Mobile Gaming Awards 2018

Sneaky Sasquatch:
 Apple Arcade Game of the Year, 2020

References 

Video game companies of Canada
Companies based in Vancouver